Eurocities is a network of large cities in Europe, established in 1986 by the mayors of six large cities: Barcelona, Birmingham, Frankfurt, Lyon, Milan and Rotterdam. Today, Eurocities members includes over 200 of Europe's major cities from 38 countries, which between them represent over 130 million people.

Eurocities is one of the major city networks in the EU. It is an example of how city diplomacy is seeking influence and prominence in the established world of international relations. At the EU level, Eurocities promotes the implementation of the European Union's subsidiarity principle. This offers multiple opportunities to engage and influence EU initiatives and policies, especially on urban development and more recently the European Green Deal. Eurocities is sometimes seen as an interest group more focused on re-establishing the power of the city over the nation-state, rather than connecting EU citizens across cities and borders. Recently, EU mayors of the network have tried to raise their global profile for their efforts to tackle climate change.

Strategy and activities 

Eurocities coordinates multiple projects in the field of mobility, environmental transition, social inclusion, and digital innovation.

The Eurocities secretariat is based in Brussels, Belgium. The network is led by an executive committee composed of 12 elected cities and their mayors. The executive committee meets at least three times a year and oversees the annual work programme, internal rules and budget, as approved by the annual general meeting (AGM). Thematic work is coordinated in six forums and a number of related working groups covering, among other topics, culture, economic development, environment, knowledge society, mobility and social affairs.

Eurocities activities include:

Advocacy: representing the voice of cities at EU level, to bring about change on the ground

Insights: Monitoring and communicating to cities the latest EU developments, funding opportunities and trends affecting them

Sharing of best practices: Facilitating the exchange of knowledge, experience and good practices between cities to scale up urban solutions

Training: develop the capacity to face current and future urban challenges

Membership criteria 
Membership of Eurocities is open to any European city with a population of 250,000 or more. Cities within the European Union become full members, and other European cities become associate members. Local authorities of smaller cities, but with a population of more than 50,000 can become partners. Companies and businesses can become associated business partners.

Members

Notes

References

External links

Lists of cities in Europe
Municipal international relations
Cross-European advocacy groups
1986 establishments in Europe
Organizations established in 1986
Urban development
Diplomacy